Spedden is a hamlet in central Alberta, Canada within Smoky Lake County.

History  
Spedden was named after one of the original surveyors who died in the area in 1919.  Previously it bore the name Cache Lake. 

Spedden received a Canadian National rail-line in 1919, and by the end of the year St. Paul residents pushed the line another 50 kilometres through Ashmont to their locality.

Demographics 
Spedden recorded a population of 56 in the 1991 Census of Population conducted by Statistics Canada.

See also 
List of communities in Alberta
List of hamlets in Alberta

References 

Hamlets in Alberta
Smoky Lake County